Bin County, or Binxian, is a county of Heilongjiang Province, Northeast China, it is under the administration of the prefecture-level city of Harbin, the capital of Heilongjiang. It borders Bayan County and Mulan County to the north, Fangzheng County to the east, Yanshou County to the southeast, Shangzhi to the south, Acheng District to the southwest, Daowai District to the west, and Hulan District to the northwest.

Administrative divisions 
There are 12 towns and five townships in the county:

Towns (镇)

Townships (乡) 
Yonghe Township
Niaohe Township
Minhe Township
Jingjian Township
Sanbao Township

Demographics 

Climate

Transport 
 G1011 Harbin–Tongjiang Expressway, which provides access to downtown Harbin

Notes and references 

Bin